(born August 11, 1968) is a Japanese softball player who played for three different positions in the 2000 Summer Olympics: The pinch hitter, left field and right field. She won the silver medal for team Japan.

References

Japanese softball players
Living people
Softball players at the 2000 Summer Olympics
Olympic softball players of Japan
Olympic silver medalists for Japan
1968 births
Olympic medalists in softball
Asian Games medalists in softball
Softball players at the 1990 Asian Games
Softball players at the 1998 Asian Games
Medalists at the 1990 Asian Games
Medalists at the 1998 Asian Games
Asian Games silver medalists for Japan
Medalists at the 2000 Summer Olympics
20th-century Japanese women